William Smith (1819–1892) was a Catholic clergyman from Scotland. He served as the Archbishop of the Archdiocese of St. Andrews and Edinburgh.

Life
Born in Edinburgh on 3 July 1819, he was ordained a priest on 15 April 1843. He was appointed the Archbishop of St. Andrews and Edinburgh on 2 October 1885 and consecrated on 28 October 1885. The principal consecrator was Archbishop Charles Petre Eyre, with Bishops John McLachlan and Angus MacDonald as co-consecrators.

Smith died in office on 16 March 1892, aged 72.

References

1819 births
1892 deaths
19th-century Roman Catholic archbishops in Scotland
Roman Catholic archbishops of St Andrews and Edinburgh
Clergy from Edinburgh